Latz is a German surname, which is derived from the Slavic given name Ladislaw, a variant of László. The name may refer to:

Bob Latz (1930-2022), American politician
Irmgard Latz (born 1939), German badminton player
Jake Latz (born 1996), American baseball player
Jean-Pierre Latz (1691–1754), German cabinetmaker
Peter Latz (born 1939), German landscape architect
Peter Latz (botanist) (born 1941), Central Australian botanist
Ron Latz (born 1963), American politician
Tallan Noble Latz (born 1999), American musician

See also
Latzke

References

German-language surnames